Kristen Knutson is an associate professor of neurology, working at the Northwestern University Feinberg School of Medicine. With researchers from the University of Surrey, she studied the mortality rate of half a million people over 6.5 years and concluded that people who self identify as "definite evening type" had a 10 percent higher mortality rate than those who identified as "definite morning type". It was the first study of its type to look into the mortality rate of night owls.

References

American neurologists
Women neurologists
American women neuroscientists
American neuroscientists
Northwestern University faculty
Year of birth missing (living people)
Living people
American women academics
21st-century American women